Amhara Governorate was one of the six governorates of Italian East Africa. Its capital was Gondar. It was formed in 1936 from parts of the conquered Ethiopian Empire following the Second Italo-Ethiopian War. It had a population of more than 2 million inhabitants (In 1940 11,200 were Italians settlers, mostly in the capital Gondar). In November 1938 some territory of Amhara in the Scioa region was given to the neighboring Addis Abeba Governorate, enlarging it to the Scioa Governorate.

The region was a stronghold of fierce Ethiopian resistance against the Italians. By 1940, the last areas of guerilla activity was around Lake Tana and southern Gojjam, under the leadership of the degiac Mengesha Gembere and Belay Zeleke.

References

Bibliography
 Antonicelli, Franco (1961) Trent'anni di storia italiana 1915–1945, Saggi series 295, Torino : Einaudi, 387 p. [in Italian]
 
 Del Boca, Angelo (1986) Italiani in Africa Orientale: La caduta dell'Impero, Biblioteca universale Laterza 186, Roma : Laterza,  [in Italian]
 Mockler, Anthony (1984). Haile Selassie's War: The Italian-Ethiopian Campaign, 1935–1941, New York : Random House,

See also
Italian East Africa
Italian Ethiopia
List of Governors of the Amhara Governorate

Governorates of Italian East Africa